Michael Jordan in Flight is a 1993 computer basketball game for DOS. It was developed by and published by Electronic Arts and is endorsed by Michael Jordan although it has no NBA licensed players or teams.

Gameplay 

The game featured a three-a-side basketball match. The camera is a 3D camera, and the game includes some filmed scenes of Michael Jordan. The game is developed in a court surrounded by nothing (even with no crowd the player can hear clapping sometimes).

Reception
Computer Gaming World praised the "incredible ... 3D-based graphic engine" as being "so far ahead of everyone else", but criticized Michael Jordan in Flight as being too easy because "the product is based on Michael Jordan. Jordan is too good overall". The magazine concluded that it "is the most visually realistic sports software on the market ... Now, they need to apply the technology to a game".

References

External links 
 Michael Jordan in Flight at thelegacy.de

1993 video games
DOS games
DOS-only games
Basketball video games
Cultural depictions of Michael Jordan
Video games based on real people
Video games developed in the United States
Video games featuring black protagonists